Mohamad Kheir Traboulsi (8 September 1950 – 22 August 2002) was an amateur Lebanese weightlifter (he was a firefighter). At the 1972 Summer Olympics, he won the silver medal in the men's Middleweight category.

Life and career

Traboulsi was born in Beirut on 26 September 1950. At 18 years of age, weighing 67.10 kg, he lifted a total of 377 kg and placed 14th among 20 participants in the 67.5 kg weightlifting category at the Mexico 1968 Olympic games. With 67 kg, he was too light for a height of 167 cm. Yet, in 1969, he set the junior world record of Middleweight with 140 kg, a very great lift, equal to the junior light heavyweight record. In Munich 1972, now weighing 74.05Kg, he lifted 160 + 140 + 172.5 = 472.5 and the silver medal for the 75 kg weightlifting category. Still in Munich, but in an out of competition attempt to break the world in the snatch, both Aimé Terme of France and Traboulsi attempted to lift 146.5 kg to break the world record, both competitors failed the lift. Traboulsi had already broken that world record in snatch on 2 previous occasions earlier in 1972: he lifted 145.5 kg on 22 Jun 1972 in Beirut, then 146 kg on 30 Jun 1972 in Amman, Jordan. After that failed attempt to break his own record in Munich, he  succeeded twice: 147.5kg on 11 Nov 1972 in Beirut and 150 kg on 25 Jan 1973 in Beirut.

Always in the 75 kg category, Traboulsi placed first at the 1975,1979, and 1983 Mediterranean games, as well as first place at the 1978 Asian games. In the 1982 Asian games, however, he placed second but in the 82.5Kg category.  In all, he participated in 3 weightlifting world championships (Havana 1973, Moscow 1980, and Sofia 1986), 3 summer Olympics (Mexico 1968, Munich 1972, and Moscow 1980), 3 Mediterranean games (Algiers 1975, Split 1979, and Casablanca 1983), and 2 Asian games (Bangkok 1978, and New Delhi 1982). Traboulsi died from cancer in 2002, aged 52.

Traboulsi at the Munich 1972 summer Olympic Games

Always in Munich, but in an out of competition attempt to break the world record in the snatch, Traboulsi attempted to lift 146.5 kg but failed the lift.

Traboulsi at the Mediterranean Games

Tarabulsi at the Asian Games

References

Sports Reference
 sports-reference.com

Notes

1950 births
2002 deaths
Sportspeople from Beirut
Lebanese male weightlifters
Olympic weightlifters of Lebanon
Weightlifters at the 1968 Summer Olympics
Weightlifters at the 1972 Summer Olympics
Weightlifters at the 1980 Summer Olympics
Olympic silver medalists for Lebanon
Olympic medalists in weightlifting
Medalists at the 1972 Summer Olympics
Asian Games medalists in weightlifting
Weightlifters at the 1978 Asian Games
Weightlifters at the 1982 Asian Games
Asian Games gold medalists for Lebanon
Asian Games silver medalists for Lebanon
Medalists at the 1978 Asian Games
Medalists at the 1982 Asian Games
Mediterranean Games gold medalists for Lebanon
Mediterranean Games medalists in weightlifting
Competitors at the 1975 Mediterranean Games
Competitors at the 1979 Mediterranean Games
Competitors at the 1983 Mediterranean Games